

History

Miss Samoa is a national beauty pageant in Samoa. It was established and administered by the Samoa Visitors Association in late 1986 and handed over to the Samoa Visitors Bureau in 1996. The pageant was created in conjunction with tourism and has remained under its authority ever since. In 1987 the first Miss Samoa was crowned she was Ursula Elizabeth Curry who went on to represent Samoa in the first ever Miss South Pacific Pageant (name changed 2015 to Miss Pacific Islands). As years followed the winner of Miss Samoa under the guidance of the Samoan Tourism Authority went on to compete in the Miss South Pacific Pageant. In 1996 Verona Ah Ching made history being the first Miss Samoa to ever be crowned Miss South Pacific.

The Miss Samoa Pageant is an annual event dedicated to supporting opportunities for young Samoan women. The winner of pageant is given the opportunity to promote Samoa regionally and internationally as the face of Samoa and work as a national ambassador during her year reign, as of 2000 the Miss Samoa Pageant has been the finale of the annual Teuila Festival. In 2018 it was announced for the first time in the 32-year history of the pageant it will be held and hosted in the big island of Savai’i later that year Sonia Piva was crowned Miss Samoa 2018 making history being the first and only winner to be crowned in Savai’i.

In a history making decision by Samoa Tourism Authority the owners of the Miss Samoa Pageant, it was announced that there will be no the Miss Samoa Pageant for the year of 2020 due to the coronavirus pandemic months before the scheduled Miss Samoa 2020 pageant in September. Fonoifafo McFarland-Seumanu the Miss Samoa and Miss Pacific Islands 2019/2020 is first and only Miss Samoa to extend her reign spanning over a two-year period in the entire history of the pageant.

Titleholders
Color key

Miss Samoa Regional Pageant Winners

Winner of Miss Samoa Regional Pageant from outside of Samoa such as Miss Samoa New Zealand, Miss Samoa Australia, Miss Samoa Victoria, Miss Samoa New South Wales and Miss Samoa USA.

Color key

Samoa Pageants Representatives

List of Samoan women who have represented Samoa during International and Regional Pageants.

Color key

Winners Gallery

See also
Samoa at major beauty pageants

External links
misssamoa.com.ws

Samoa
Samoa
Recurring events established in 1977